The Northrop N-3PB Nomad was a single-engined American floatplane of the 1940s. Northrop developed the N-3PB as an export model based on the earlier Northrop A-17 design. A total of 24 were purchased by Norway, but were not delivered until after the Fall of Norway during the Second World War. Exiled Norwegian forces used them from 1941, operating from Iceland, for convoy escort, anti-submarine patrols, and training purposes from "Little Norway" in Canada. Within two years of delivery, the design was effectively obsolete in its combat role, and the remaining N-3PBs were replaced by larger aircraft in 1943.

Design and development
Following increased international tension surrounding the German annexation of the Sudetenland in 1938, the Norwegian parliament granted extraordinary appropriations to modernize the Norwegian Armed Forces. The Royal Norwegian Navy Air Service (RNNAS) and the Norwegian Army Air Service were prioritized for funds from the  Norwegian Neutrality Fund. The RNNAS' share of the funds were designated to buy 12 Heinkel He 115 torpedo bombers and 24 reconnaissance aircraft, as well as several new naval air stations. The Dornier Do 22, Northrop 8-A, Northrop 2GP and Vultee V-11 GB were considered and proposals retrieved. The commission quickly decided the Vultee V-11 GB was the best aircraft to satisfy both air services' needs.

On 30 December 1939, Norway sent a purchasing commission to the United States, consisting of a Royal Norwegian Navy Air Service contingent headed by Cmdr. Kristian Østby, and a Norwegian Army Air Service contingent led by Birger Fredrik Motzfeldt. The goal of the commission was to inspect the Vultee V-11, which would serve as a new common reconnaissance bomber for the two air services. Amongst the requirements the commission hoped to fill was replacing the Royal Norwegian Navy Air Service's M.F.11 biplane patrol aircraft. Once in the US, the commission found that Vultee would not be able to deliver the V-11 within a reasonable amount of time so another aircraft had to be found. Motzfeldt quickly found that the Douglas 8A-5N would satisfy the NOAAS' requirements. As the Douglas 8A-5N could not be fitted with floats, Østby continued to look for an aircraft suitable for the RNNAS. After visits to many of the aviation companies in February 1940, Østby determined that only one manufacturer had both a design and available production capacity, Northrop Aircraft Incorporated. Half the amount was paid shortly before the German invasion of Norway on 9 April 1940.

The Model 8-A, the export model of the Northrop Attack Bomber series was never intended to serve as the basis of a floatplane and had to be redesigned to meet the requirements of the Norwegian order. The new N-3PB was the first product of Northrop Aircraft, which had reformed in 1939, and was a low-winged cantilever monoplane fitted with twin floats. First intended for a lower powered engine, the N-3PB was ultimately powered by a Wright Cyclone radial engine, of the same type specified for the Douglas 8A-5N bombers and Curtiss Hawk 75A-8s ordered by Norway at the same time, simplifying the eventual maintenance and operation requirements for the entire Norwegian military aircraft fleets.

With the Norwegian operation requirements drawn up for a coastal reconnaissance floatplane, a series of modifications were requested to the original design. The changes included a redesign of the float structure to accommodate either a torpedo or bomb load carried under the center fuselage to supplement five underwing bomb racks. Additional armament changes led to a combination of six machine guns replacing the four machine gun (two fixed forward, two flexible rear-mounted 7.9 mm)/one cannon (forward facing, fixed 20 mm) arrangement that was in the initial design. Provision for a rear under-fuselage gun was also made. Further equipment requirements including fitting a rear fuselage-mounted camera as well as changes to instrumentation and radio equipment.

Before Northrop could complete any aircraft, Norway was invaded by Germany. The invasion and occupation of Norway necessitated that the armament of the N-3PB, originally to be installed in Norway, had to be changed. Initial specifications listed one Oerlikon 20 mm cannon in each wing, as well as two 7.9 mm Fabrique Nationale machine guns each in both fuselage and rear gunner stations. Owing to the lack of availability of the originally specified armament, Norwegian-manufactured Colt heavy machine guns were substituted with four Colt MG53A .50 cal. machine guns in the wings and two .30 cal. Colt MG40s mounted in dorsal and ventral positions of the gunner's rear cockpit.

Operational history

Delivery
Northrop's Chief Test Pilot Vance Breese flew the first N-3PB (c/n 301) on 22 December 1940 from Lake Elsinore, California. The flight test and customer acceptance trials were successfully completed using the first production aircraft. Due to the use of the more powerful Cyclone engine, all performance estimates were exceeded and flight characteristics including maneuverability were considered "excellent." All 24 aircraft were delivered to the exiled Royal Norwegian Navy Air Service by the end of March 1941.

Training
In late February 1941, six production N-3PBs were flown to RCAF Station Patricia Bay, Vancouver Island in Canada, one of the Canadian winter bases of the Flyvåpnenes Treningsleir (FTL) Norwegian training bases known as "Little Norway". 
The N-3PB's service as an advanced trainer in Canada in the "Little Norway" summer base at Island Harbour, Toronto and winter bases along the western coast of Canada, was relatively brief and ended when it was determined that pilot and air crew graduates were to be integrated into RAF squadrons. Arrangements were made later in 1941 for the advanced flight training of Norwegian pilots to be carried out in RAF and Royal Canadian Air Force schools on types that better fit the transition to combat flying. Consequently, the three surviving N-3PBs were stored until shipped to Iceland in March 1942 on the steamer .

Combat use

The remaining 18 N-3PBs were used to equip No. 330 (Norwegian) Squadron RAF in Reykjavík, Iceland. The N-3PBs sent to Iceland were all shipped across the Atlantic in crates on board the Norwegian steamer , the voyage from New York to Reykjavik taking 13 days to complete. Part of the reason for deploying the N-3PBs to Iceland were to avoid having the unusual aircraft operating over the United Kingdom, with the involved risk of friendly fire incidents. The exiled Norwegian military authorities had originally wanted to base the squadron in the United Kingdom in order to be able to operate off German-occupied Norway.

No. 330(N) Squadron was declared operational on 25 April 1941; the N-3PBs were erected in a seaplane hangar at Reykjavik, with the first aircraft flying by 2 June 1941. The squadron flew antisubmarine and convoy escort patrols from 23 June 1941, with flights based at Reykjavík, Akureyri and Búðareyri. While the squadron's N-3PBs carried out eight attacks on German U-boats, including one on U-570 after it had surrendered to the British, no U-boats were sunk. On a number of occasions in 1942, the N-3PBs clashed with Focke-Wulf Fw 200 long range reconnaissance bombers and Blohm & Voss BV 138 flying boats, being credited with at least one damaged. On 10 October 1942, a "Northrop" from Búðareyri was involved in a friendly fire incident, attacking a British Lockheed Hudson. The incident ended without any of the aircraft involved being hit.

In an effort to publicize the N-3PB operations, the British Air Ministry circulated a report that two Norwegian-flown aircraft had been involved in the attack on the German battleship Bismarck on 21–22 May 1941, but it was merely an example of wartime propaganda. Despite many aviation historians disputing the claim, it still appears in current accounts of the sinking of the Bismarck.
No. 330(N) was formed on 25 April 1941 and received its first of 18 N-3PBs on 19 May, two days before the attack on the Bismark but didn't fly until 2 June 1941 and their first official operational flight wasn't until 23 June 1941. No. 330(N) Squadron began supplementing the N-3PBs with Consolidated Catalina flying boats in 1942, and both the Catalina and the N-3PB began to be displaced in February 1943 by the arrival of the more capable Short Sunderland. Flying boats allowed for longer patrols to be carried out, and had superior seakeeping qualities to the N-3PB. The surviving N-3PBs continued to operate alongside the Catalinas, flying fighter patrol, escort and antisubmarine operations off Iceland's east coast until early 1943. Throughout the transition to other types, the squadron's C-Flight maintained an "all-Northrop" unit, predominately involved in secondary roles including army cooperation, transport, air-sea rescue, ice reconnaissance and ambulance roles. In early 1943, No. 330(N)'s crews relocated to Oban, Scotland, aboard the troop ship . Two of the remaining N-3PBs flew to Oban. The eight aircraft left behind on Iceland were scrapped in Reykjavik between December 1942 – April 1943.

Throughout its combat service from 23 June 1941 – 30 March 1943, No. 330(N)'s N-3PBs carried out 1,1011 operational sorties, totalling 3,512 hours flying time. Although the eight attacks they carried out on U-boats proved inconclusive, N-3PB escort patrols and antisubmarine sweeps were an important part of the Allied effort in keeping the North Atlantic sea lanes open. After the end of the type's combat service on Iceland, the Norwegian naval authorities considered basing two N-3PBs on Svalbard, an Arctic archipelago previously known as Spitzbergen. A German naval raid on 8 September 1943 resulted in the deployment being cancelled.

Military operators

 Royal Norwegian Navy Air Service
 No. 330(N) Squadron RAF
 The Flyvåpnenes Treningsleir (FTL), "Little Norway" Training Unit

Surviving aircraft

After the war, two surviving N-3PBs (c/n 306, 322) aircraft were flown to Norway, sold for salvage, with c/n 306 being scrapped in 1949 and c/n 322 scrapped in 1956.

After a search through records, Ragnar R. Ragnarsson, then vice president of the Icelandic Aviation Historical Society pinpointed the crash site of N-3PB (c/n 320 ["U"]). In 1979, the N-3PB wreck was recovered from the Þjórsá River in Iceland. Due to bad weather over Iceland's east coast, the N-3PB flown by Lt. W.W. Bulukin, operating from Búðareyri and transiting to Reykjavik, made a forced landing on 21 April 1943. After being stuck in the silt, it gradually sunk to the river's bottom.

US Navy divers began its initial recovery, later aided by a team of volunteer divers from Great Britain, Iceland, Norway and the United States, bringing up the remains that were sent to the Northrop Aircraft Corporation in Hawthorne, California. Restoration was completed by a 300 strong volunteer group, including 14 retired ex-Northrop employees who had been involved in the original N-3PB production line. The complex restoration required the construction of replacement parts primarily by templating many damaged or corroded original aircraft components in order to create a complete airframe. In November 1980 the restored N-3PB was gifted to Norway by the Northrop Aircraft Corporation and the San Diego Aerospace Museum. This only surviving aircraft is currently on exhibition as part of Norwegian Armed Forces Aircraft Collection at Gardermoen, Norway.

Specifications (N-3PB)

See also

References

Notes

Citations

Bibliography
 Bean, David J. The Restoration. Washougal, Washington: HL/Ho Logos Press, 2003. .
 Beaucamp, Gerry. "The Hawks of Norway." Chatsworth, California: Challenge Publications, Air Classics, Volume 12, No. 1, January 1976.
 Beaucamp, Gerry and Annika Richert. "Norwegian Warriors." Air Classics, Volume 14, No. 2, February 1978.
 Bishop, Chris. "The Encyclopedia of Weapons of World War II". New York: Sterling Publishing Company, 2002. .
 Blair, Clay. Hitler's U-Boat War: The Hunters 1939–1942. London: Cassell, 2000. .
 Coleman, Ted. Jack Northrop and the Flying Wing: The Real Story Behind the Stealth Bomber. New York: Paragon House, 1988. .
 Green, William. War Planes of the Second World War: Volume Six, Floatplanes. London: Macdonald, 1962.
 Guhnfeldt, Cato. Sagaen om de norske Northrop-flyene på Island (in Norwegian). Oslo: Sem&Stenersen, 1981. .
 Hafsten, Bjørn and Tom Arheim. Marinens Flygevåpen 1912–1944 (in Norwegian). Oslo: TankeStreken AS, 2003. .
 Hansen, Conradi. Little Norway: A Message of Liberty to the Hills of Home. Oslo: Military Historical Foundation of Eastern Norway, 1985. .
 Henriksen, Vera. Luftforsvarets historie bind 2 (in Norwegian) Oslo: Aschehoug, 1996. .
 Lake, Jon. Sunderland Squadrons of World War 2. Oxford, UK: Osprey Publishing, 2000. .
 Lillevik, Finn. Forsvarets luftflaade 1912–1982: beskrivelser av våre bevarte militære fly Forsvarsmuseets småskrift no. 2 (in Norwegian) Oslo: Norwegian Armed Forces Museum, 1984. .
 March, Daniel J. British Warplanes of World War II. London: Aerospace Publishing, 1998. .
 O'Leary, Michael. "Northrop's N-3PB." Chatsworth, California: Challenge Publications, Air Classics, Volume 17, No. 3, March 1981.
 Ragnarsson, Ragnar R. "Phantom of the Fjords: Northrop's Flying Viking!" Granada Hills, California: Sentry Books, Wings, Vol. 11, No. 1, February 1981.
 Saunders, Reginald, S. J. Little Norway in Pictures: With Supplement, Norway – Yesterday and Today (Also on cover, R.N.A.F. in Canada). Toronto: S. J. R. Saunders, 1944.
 Ulvensøen, Jon. Brennpunkt Nord – Værtjenestekrigen 1940–45 (in Norwegian). Oslo: Norwegian Armed Forces Museum, 1991. 
 Wiig, Erling. "Message of Liberty." Stamford, Lincolnshire: Key Publishing, Flypast, No. 338, September 2009.

External links

 Popular Mechanics, February 1942, rare photo at bottom of page showing rear-bottom gun position
 Northrop N-3PB photos
 Northrop N-3PB Torpedo Bomber

N-3PB
Single-engined tractor aircraft
Low-wing aircraft
Floatplanes
1930s United States patrol aircraft
Aircraft first flown in 1940